The Second Municipality (In Italian: Seconda Municipalità or Municipalità 2) is one of the ten boroughs in which the Italian city of Naples is divided. It is the littlest municipality per surface.

Geography
The municipality is located in the middle of the city. In its territory there are located the port and the central railway station.

Its territory includes the zones of Quartieri Spagnoli, Borgo Orefici and Forcella.

Administrative division
The Second Municipality is divided into 6 quarters:

References

External links
 Municipalità 2 official site
 Municipalità 2 page on Naples website

Municipality 02